Anneli Marian Drecker (born 12 February 1969, in Tromsø, Norway) is a Norwegian singer and actress from the city of Tromsø. She is the frontwoman for the dream pop band Bel Canto.

Life and career

Drecker's father Peter, a German from Bielefeld, emigrated in 1960 to Norway.

In the fall of 2006 Bel Canto celebrated the twentieth anniversary of the first album with several concerts. She has released three solo albums, and has provided vocals for various artists including Motorpsycho, Jan Bang, Savoy, a-ha, Röyksopp, Jah Wobble, Ketil Bjørnstad, Simon Raymonde, Mental Overdrive, Illumination and Hector Zazou.

Drecker contributed as composer and singer in a production of Pär Lagerkvist's Bøddelen at Det Norske Teatret (2000), and has worked as a freelance actress and composer at Hålogaland Teater from 2009 to 2015.
 
She worked with fellow Norwegians Röyksopp,  since 1999-2012 including as the vocalist on the track "Sparks" and as their live vocalist (as heard on their live album Royksopp's Night Out), on three songs on their album Junior. Additionally, she appeared with countrymen a-ha on their Minor Earth, Major Sky Tour and appeared on the live DVD Live from Vallhall and the following album from their European Tour, How Can I Sleep With Your Voice In My Head..

In 2004 she was a jury member in the Norwegian version of Pop Idol. She continues to occasionally perform live in Norway.
In 2012 Drecker took part in the NRK TV-show Stjernekamp, first season. 
In 2014 she appeared again on TV2 as one of the artists in the famous series "Hver Gang Vi Møtes".

On her latest album Rocks And Straws (2015) we are given the home reversion of a journey that began in 1986 with Bel Canto. During the journey, it became increasingly clearer to Drecker where she comes from, and the music she creates is the result of this Nordic arctic acoustic landscape, with influences of music from all around the world. She has composed the music with lyrics based on poems by the Northern Norwegian poet Arvid Hanssen. At the Vossajazz festival 2015, Drecker performed the tune "Little Tree" from this album, with her daughter Luna (b. 2006).

Honors
1992: Spellemannprisen in the category Pop, with Bel Canto for the album Shimmering, Warm and Bright
1996: Spellemannprisen in the categories Band and Dance/techno, with Bel Canto for the album Magic Box
2007: Nordlysprisen
2008: Gammlengprisen in Open class

Filmography
1983: Søsken på Guds jord as Margit, by Laila Mikkelsen
1992: Svarte pantere as Sonia, by Thomas Robsahm
2000: De 7 dødssyndene, by Ø. Karlsen, M. Olin, M. Sødahl, F. Mosvold & L. Gud

Theatre
2000: "Bøddelen"/ "The executioner" (as archangel), from Pär Lagerkvist, directed by Yngve Sundvor  at Det Norske Teatret
2004:" "Peer Gynt" (as Solveig) The North Norwegian Theater Company, directed by Alex Scherpf- Tromsø, Meieriet 2004
2009: "Hamsun's Feberr" / "Hamsun's Fever" (as Alvhilde), directed by Jon Tombre-Hålogaland Teater, homepage review in Nordlys, review in ITromsø
2010: "Vi Hever Våre Hoder I Skam"/ "We Raise Our Heads In Shame", directed by Kristin Eriksen Bjorn and Jon Tombre - Ferske Scener, Tromsø
2011:  "Knutby" (as Åsa Waldau, The Bride of Christ), directed by Kjersti horn -Hålogaland Teater, homepage,
2011:  "The Black Rider" (musical with music from Tom Waits), directed by Sigrid Reibo- Hålogaland Teater, homepage
2012:  "Blikktrommen" / "The Tin Drum", (as the mother of Oscar; Agnes) from Günter Grass, directed by Jon Tombre -Hålogaland Teater, homepage
2014:  The Operetta "Kiberg Odyssey" (as Penelope) together with Arctic Philharmonic Orchestra (NOSO), music Composed by Trygve Brøske, directed by Ivar Tindberg, homepage,press pictures on flickr
2015:  "Trollmannen fra Oz" / "The Wizard of Oz", (as Toto, the dog, Dorothy' s best friend) from L. Frank Baum, directed by Jon Tombre, music by Snah Motorpsycho - Hålogaland Teater, homepage

Discography

Solo albums
2000: Tundra (EMI Music)
2005: Frolic (Capitol Records)
2015: Rocks and Straws (Rune Grammofon), lyrics by Roy-Frode Løvland, based on poems by Arvid Hanssen
2017: Revelation for Personal Use (Rune Grammofon)

Singles
From Tundra
2000: "It's All Here"
2000: "Sexy Love"
2000: "All I Know"

From Frolic
2005: "Stop This"
2005: "You Don't Have To Change"

From Rocks & Straws
2015: "Circulating Light"
2015: "Come Summer's Wind" ( radio single )

Music videos
2005: "You Don´t Have To Change"
2015: "Alone" official video on vimeo

Bel Canto 
1987: White-Out Conditions (Crammed Discs)
1989: Birds of Passage (Crammed Discs) (Nettwerk Productions in North America)
1992: Shimmering, Warm and Bright (Crammed Discs) (Dali/Chameleon/Elektra Records in North America) (Columbia/SME Records in France)
1996: Magic Box (Lava/Atlantic)
1998: Rush (EMI Records)
2001: Retrospect (WEA Records), compilation album
2002: Dorothy's Victory (EMI Records)

Collaborations
1989: Song Of Joy (Crammed Discs), by Tsunematsu Matsui featuring Anneli Marian Drecker
1989: East On Fire (Crammed Discs), by Foreign Affair featuring Anneli Drecker & Apoptygma Berzerker on the tracks "Ghosts Can't Run Away", "Diversion", "Misunderstanding", "Keep Me In", "The Same"
1992: Sahara Blue (Crammed Discs), by Hector Zazou featuring Anneli Drecker and Gérard Depardieu on the track "I'll Strangle You"
1994: Take Me To God (Island Records), by Jah Wobble's Invaders Of The Heart featuring Anneli Drecker on the tracks "Becoming More Like God", "When The Storm Comes"
1994: Timothy's Monster (EMI Music), by Motorpsycho on the track "The Golden Core"
1995: Mantra For Peace (Warner Elektra Atlantic), by Music Channel
1997:  Sou (Oricon) by Inoran featuring Anneli Drecker on the track "Monsoon Baby"
2000: Sing a Song for You (Manifesto Records), with Simon Raymonde for the tribute to Tim Buckley on the track "Morning Glory"
2001: Grace (EmArcy) by Ketil Bjørnstad (Recorded live at Vossajazz, 2000) (text: John Donne, 1562–1626)
2001: Melody A.M. (Wall of Sound), by Röyksopp on the track "Sparks"
2002: Lifelines (Warner Elektra Atlantic), by a-ha on the track "Turn the Lights Down"
2003: The Nest (Emarcy), by Ketil Bjørnstad (featured vocalist on a number of songs)
2005: You and Me Against the World (GUN Records), by Apoptygma Berzerk on the track "Back on Track"
2008: Tome 2 1987 - 1995 (Infrastition Records), by Complot Bronswick (featured vocalist on a number of songs)
2009: Junior (Wall of Sound), by Röyksopp on the tracks "Vision One", "You Don't Have a Clue", "True to Life"
2018: A Suite Of Poems (ECM records), by Ketil Bjørnstad featuring Anneli Drecker

References

External links
 
Anneli Drecker official website
Bel Canto official website
Bel Canto's official MySpace profile
Anneli Drecker - You Don't Have To Change on YouTube
Official video for "Alone" - 2015
Anneli Drecker's instagram

1969 births
Living people
Spellemannprisen winners
Norwegian women singers
Norwegian film actresses
English-language singers from Norway
EMI Records artists
Capitol Records artists
Musicians from Tromsø
People from Tromsø
Rune Grammofon artists
Norwegian people of German descent